Ron Estay (born December 22, 1948) is a former defensive lineman for the Edmonton Eskimos of the Canadian Football League (CFL).

Career

After graduating from Louisiana State University (LSU) in 1972, he was selected by the Denver Broncos in the 8th round of the 1972 NFL Draft. He moved to Canada and played for the British Columbia Lions in 1972 and Edmonton from 1973 to 1982, and helped lead the team to five straight Grey Cup championships from 1978 to 1982 as a key member of the "Alberta Crude" defense. He played in 1983 and 1984 for the Washington Federals of the United States Football League (USFL).

Estay was a two time CFL All-Star in 1977 and 1980 and Western All-Star four times in 1973, 1977, 1978 and 1980. He played in nine Grey Cup championships, winning six times. One of Estay's biggest games was the 1977 Grey Cup also known as the 'Staples Game'. In that game, Estay recalls how, due to the nature of the game he 'tried every pair of shoes that we had' (in order to good footing due to the field conditions).

Estay is a member of the Canadian Football Hall of Fame, the Alberta Sports Hall of Fame, the Louisiana Sports Hall of Fame, and the Eskimos Hall of Fame.

Coaching

From 2001 to 2008, Estay was the defensive line coach for the Saskatchewan Roughriders.  He was a coach on the 2007 Grey Cup championship team.

Personal

In 2008, Estay was diagnosed with non-Hodgkin's lymphoma, which went into remission after 3 months of chemotherapy.

References

1948 births
Living people
American players of Canadian football
BC Lions players
Canadian football defensive linemen
Canadian Football Hall of Fame inductees
Edmonton Elks players
LSU Tigers football players
People from Raceland, Louisiana
Players of American football from Louisiana
Washington Federals/Orlando Renegades players